Delay line may refer to:

 Propagation delay, the length of time taken for something to reach its destination
 Analog delay line, used to delay a signal
 Bi-directional delay line, a numerical analysis technique used in computer simulation for solving ordinary differential equations by converting them to hyperbolic equations
 Digital delay line, a sequential logic element
 Delay-line memory, a form of computer memory used on some of the earliest digital computers